HMS King Alfred is a Royal Naval Reserve shore establishment  in Portsmouth, England. The unit has a complement of over 200 reservists and provides training facilities to other lodger units, including the local Royal Marines Reserve (RMR) City of London (Portsmouth Detachment), and local University Royal Naval Unit (URNU). 

In April 2021, it moved to the renovated "Semaphore Tower", within HMNB Portsmouth.

The unit is affiliated with Southampton University Royal Naval Unit and Bearwood College Combined Cadet Force and provides local representation at events including the Ship Festival, in Chichester; and the Remembrance Sunday services in Portsmouth and Hove. Members of the unit are also honorary freedom holders of the City of Portsmouth. Penny Mordaunt, the local MP and former Secretary of State for Defence, was an acting sub-lieutenant there from 2010 until 2015.

Notes

References
Warlow, Ben, Shore Establishments of the Royal Navy, Liskeard : Maritime, 2000. 

Royal Navy shore establishments
Royal Navy bases in England